218 (two hundred [and] eighteen) is the natural number following 217 and preceding 219.

In mathematics 
Mertens function(218) = 3, a record high.
218 is nontotient and also noncototient.
218 is the number of inequivalent ways to color the 12 edges of a cube using at most 2 colors, where two colorings are equivalent if they differ only by a rotation of the cube.
There are 218 nondegenerate Boolean functions of 3 variables.
The number of surface points on a 73 cube.

In other fields 
218 is the current number of votes in the US House of Representatives a party or coalition needs to win in order to achieve a majority.
The years 218 and 218 BC
Area code 218, for northern Minnesota.

References

Integers